Tukiya Kankasa-Mabula, sometimes Tukiya Kankasa Mabula, is a Zambian lawyer, educator, administrator and gender issues advocate. She served as the deputy governor, administration at the Bank of Zambia (BoZ), till 15 December 2019. She was replaced by Rhekha Mhango, the former head of the Human Resource Department at the central bank. the country's central bank and national banking regulator. She was appointed to that position in 2007, by Levy Mwanawasa, the president of Zambia at that time, replacing Felix Mfula, who retired.

History
Kankasa-Mabula is a native of Zambia. Following her education in Lusaka, Cambridge, Massachusetts and London, she returned to her alma mater, the University of Zambia, Faculty of Law, where she taught commercial law. For a period of time, she worked as director of licensing and enforcement at the Zambian Securities and Exchange Commission. In 1998, she joined the Bank of Zambia, as the bank's secretary and chief legal advisor. She served in that capacity for nine years, before being appointed to her current position.

Overview
Kankasa-Mabula is a respected attorney, educator, administrator, businesswoman and gender issues advocate. In March 2014, she was a panellist on a televised discussion among the 100 most influential women in Zambia. The discussion was featured on CNBC's Africa Service on Monday, 31 March 2014.

In April 2014, she was selected as the recipient of the International Bar Association's 2014 Outstanding International Woman Lawyer Award. The award was given "in recognition of professional excellence, influencing other women to pursue careers in law, and advancing opportunities for women within the legal profession". The IBA Outstanding International Woman Lawyer Award is given every other year and is sponsored by LexisNexis. It includes a donation of US$5,000 to a charity of the winner's choice. The 2014 award presentation ceremony will take place during the IBA 6th World Women Lawyers’ Conference, to be held from 8 to 9 May 2014 in Paris, France.

Education
She holds the degree of Bachelor of Laws obtained from the University of Zambia, in Lusaka. She also holds the degree of Master of Laws obtained from Harvard University, in Cambridge, Massachusetts, United States. Her Doctor of Philosophy in law was obtained from the University of London, in the United Kingdom.

Other responsibilities
Kankasa-Mabula is the current vice chairperson of the Council of the  University of Zambia. She also serves as the chairperson of the Legal Steering Committee of the Committee of Central Bank Governors (CCBG) in Southern African Development Community (SADC).

Photos
Kankasa-Mabula in 2014 at ibanet.org
 Kankasa-Mabula (right) With Zambia's First Lady Thandiwe Banda (left) at State House, Lusaka at lusakatimes.com

See also
 List of banks in Zambia
 Bank of Zambia

References

Year of birth missing (living people)
Living people
Academic staff of the University of Zambia
Zambian businesspeople
20th-century Zambian lawyers
Zambian women lawyers
University of Zambia alumni
Harvard Law School alumni
Alumni of the University of London
Zambian women in business
21st-century Zambian women